Xerocrassa kydonia is a species of air-breathing land snail, a pulmonate gastropod mollusk in the family Geomitridae.

Distribution

This species is endemic to Greece, where it is restricted to north-west Crete, from Platanos in the west to Kakopetros in the east, and the Rodopou peninsula in the north.

See also
List of non-marine molluscs of Greece

References

 Bank, R. A.; Neubert, E. (2017). Checklist of the land and freshwater Gastropoda of Europe. Last update: July 16th, 2017

Further reading

kydonia
Molluscs of Europe
Endemic fauna of Crete
Gastropods described in 2009